Turna or Turňa may refer to:

Turňa
 Turňa (river), a river in Slovakia
 Turňa nad Bodvou, a village and municipality in Slovakia
 Turňa Castle, in Turňa nad Bodvou
 The Slavic name for Torna County, Kingdom of Hungary

Turna
 "Turna" (song), a Turkish and Greek folk song
 Turna, Mengen,  a village in Bolu Province, Turkey
 Turna, Kardzhali Province, a village in Bulgaria
 Turna, Poland, a village in Węgrów County
 Turna clan, of Punjab

See also
 Torna (disambiguation)